Wisłoka Dębica is one of the oldest existing sports clubs in Poland, founded in 1908 by a group of Dębica's high school students. The name comes from the River Wisłoka, which flows by the town of Dębica (south-east Poland, 110 kilometers east of Kraków). The most famous athletes, representing the club, are Greco-Roman wrestlers. They won numerous medals, including Olympic, World and European Championships. Names like twins Kazimierz Lipień and Józef Lipień, Ryszard Świerad, Jan Michalik or Roman Wrocławski (who later emigrated to the US, and was the coach of Rulon Gardner) are well known by all fans of wrestling. The club is also renowned for soccer players such as Leszek Pisz, Mirosław Kalita and Waldemar Piątek, who started their careers there, boxers (such as vice-champion of Europe, Roman Gotfryd), and bicycle racers.

First departments, opened in 1908/09, were bicycle-racing, track and field, and well as skating. Association football, the most popular of all sports in Poland, followed some time later – around 1909 (though there is no credible source to confirm this date). The best decade for the club were the 1970s, when its departments were separately sponsored by Dębica's main factories, and its athletes won medals during various national and international competitions. White-green athletes marked their presence on several sports arenas. However, since the 1990s, following a general slump in Polish sports, Wisłoka also has had many financial problems. There are few sponsors, and most of them are local businesses, whose financial means are limited. Therefore, most sports departments have been closed, except for football, wrestling and women volleyball.

Supporters

Wisłoka is famous for its die-hard fans. Even in times of club's misery, its supporters always attended various games and strongly believed that the good times would be back. Fans' support is very strong to this day – it is the supporters who purchased plastic seats and then mounted them in the stands. In the mid-2000s, the fans created their own association, called Nasz KS, which financially supports the club. A very large factor of the success was the player Edward Kaczor.

Supporters of Wisłoka are allied with fans of two other clubs – Górnik Zabrze (since September 1988) and Siarka Tarnobrzeg (since November 2007). Their biggest rivals are local neighbours Igloopol Dębica with whom they contest the Dębica Derby.

Wisłoka's soccer team throughout the history

First years
During the first decades of Wisłoka's existence, its soccer players did not manage to achieve anything worth mentioning. In the 1920s and 1930s the team would play games against sides from Tarnów, Mielec, Rzeszów or Jasło. In the early 1930s, one of the best teams in Poland – Cracovia, came to Dębica for a friendly game. Players from Kraków did not treat this match seriously, thus white-green boys managed to tie against the famous rival. However, first 50 years of club's existence can be summarized as not very impressive. The most successful were late 1920s, when Wisłoka played in the regional B-Class of Tarnów, which is the equivalent of today's Third Division.

First successes in soccer came in the late 50s. Firstly, in 1957, now non-existent team Stal Dębica was promoted to the 3rd Division (however – just for one year). Four years later Stal merged with Wisłoka and in June 1963 the much stronger team emerged, that won games in Rzeszów's regional league, advancing six points before Czuwaj Przemysl. Then, in the play-offs for the national Third Division, Wisłoka came out as the 3rd team and did not manage to get promotion. Dębica's side opponents were: Victoria Jaworzno, Star Starachowice, Orzeł Rapid (which later became GKS Katowice) and Górnik Sosnowiec. In the mid-60s, favorite player of Wisłoka's supporters was the top-scorer Jerzy Maślanka. Even though he studied in Rzeszów, he always had enough time to come to Dębica and put on white-green jersey. In 1966 Wisłoka's officials bought a veteran, but otherwise very experienced and key midfield player – Ludwik Poświat, who, as a 17-year-old, talented teenager, had won the Championships of Poland (in 1948, with Cracovia). He finished his career in 1972 and remained in Dębica, becoming a trainer of youth teams. Poświat died in 1976.

In the season 1966–67, the team was expected to advance to the Third Division. Wisłoka managed to do so, but not without problems. After fall season, Wisłoka was second, behind the reserve team of Stal Rzeszów. In the spring of 1967, the white-green, whose strength was improved by some new players, did not lose 12 consecutive games and won promotion.

Promotions to the Second Division
Five years later, in the early summer of 1972, another promotion took place – this time to the prestigious Second, National Division. Wisłoka finished first, five points ahead of CKS Czeladź. Wisłoka, sponsored by DZOS Stomil (today – Tire Company Dębica) spent seven years in the Second Division. White-green team placed for most time in the mid-part of the table, only once – in 1975 – finishing on 5th position. In the season 1978–79, in the first round Wisłoka was placed on a good, 8th position. Spring round, however, was a catastrophe. Dębica's favourites lost many games and as a result Wisłoka was relegated back to the 3rd Division

Relegation and lean years
After relegation, Wisłoka wanted to return to the 2nd Division as fast as possible. In the season 1979-80 it was missed narrowly – the white-green finished second, just after Stal Rzeszów. The 1980s were not as good as the 1970s. The team played in the 3rd Division, group 8th (south-east Poland), for most time placing in the upper half of the table. Unfortunately, Wisłoka never managed to fight for promotion. Apart from main team, there was also a reserve team, two junior and several youth teams. They played in regional games, also in a Ludwik Poświat U-19 Junior Tournament, which was organized every summer since 1979. 
 
In 1987 a big disappointment took place. Wisłoka was relegated to the 4th Division. This was a shock for both fans and officials. Some changes took place, after which the white-green in June 1988 returned to the 3rd Division, finishing before both BKS Bochnia and Okocimski Brzesko. In 1988–89, Polish Soccer Association (PZPN) made some changes. Instead of eight groups of the 3rd Division, four much stronger groups were created. Competition was tougher, but Wisłoka never had any problems with keeping itself on the safe position.

Another promotion
In 1990-91 Wisłoka again, after several years, won promotion to the Second National Division, group south, finishing ahead of Sandecja Nowy Sącz and Cracovia. The team, led by coach Jan Kasowicz during the whole season proved its quality, winning 14 games, drawing 7, and losing only 3 (goals 40–13). In the 2nd Division Wisłoka was for the most time placing in the middle positions of the table. The highest location (7th) was in the season 1993–94. In June 1995 however, the team was relegated back to the Regional Division. Obviously, both players and officials wanted to win promotion as soon as possible, but this proved impossible. In 1995-96 Wisłoka was second, just behind Wawel Kraków, in 1996–97, Dębica's favourites were second again, finishing after Czuwaj Przemyśl.

Four years in Fourth Division and 2006 promotion
In June 2001 Wisłoka was relegated even lower – to the 4th Podkarpacie Division. In the season 2004-2005 Wisłoka was second, just behind Stal Sanok. At the end of the season 2005-2006 the white-green finished on the first position in the league, three points ahead of Izolator Boguchwała, and won promotion to the 3rd Division. In the season 2006–2007, Wisłoka played in the fourth group of the 3rd Division and came off in the middle of the 16-team table. Next season, 2007-2008 was similar, after all games, Wisłoka was placed in the mid-table.

Cup of Poland
Wisłoka, a team which has never managed to qualify to the First Division, is an example of a club whose biggest successes are associated with Cup of Poland. Of many Wisłoka's games in the Cup of Poland throughout the years, two matches need mentioning. First is an edition in the soccer season 1988–1989. Second is Wisłoka's biggest-ever success so far – reaching as far as quarter-finals of the competition, which took place in the season 1992–93.

1988-1989 season
Wisłoka was at that time playing in the 3rd Regional Division, group 8th (south-east Poland). The team finished the season on the 8th position, just before the reserve team of Igloopol Dębica. The future opponent of Wisłoka in the Cup of Poland, Górnik Zabrze, was at that time by far the best team in Poland, winning Polish Championships for four successive years (1985-86-87-88). Many excellent players represented Górnik in those years. Among them were Jozef Wandzik, Józef Dankowski, Waldemar Matysik, Andrzej Iwan, Ryszard Komornicki, Jan Urban, Andrzej Pałasz. On 24 July 1989, in the first round of the Cup of Poland, Wisłoka beat Glinik Gorlice 3–0. On 3 August 1989 Wisłoka defeated Radomiak Radom 2–0, and on 17 August 1989, Wisłoka beat Resovia Rzeszów 5–2. Finally, on 31 August 1989 Wisłoka Dębica tied 0–0 with Górnik Zabrze losing 4–5 on penalty shootout. Undoubtedly, this game was the biggest sports event in the history of the town. The stands were full – around 10,000 fans showed up (which made for around one-fourth of the town's population). As minutes passed by, more and more people started to chant songs and clap their hands. During final minutes of the game, the whole crowd was actively supporting Wisłoka.

1992-93 season
In that season Wisłoka played in the Eastern group of the 2nd National Division, placing on the 12th position. The future opponent of Dębica's side in the Cup of Poland, Ruch Chorzów, was one of top Polish teams, placing in the fourth location in the First Division (behind Lech Poznań, Legia Warszawa and ŁKS Łódź). Officially, it was the reserve team that represented Ruch in this Cup season, but according to the rules first team players were allowed to take part and so they did. Among others, the following players represented Ruch: Radosław Gilewicz, Waldemar Fornalik, Mariusz Srutwa, Dariusz Gęsior, Jacek Bednarz, Piotr Mosor. On 12 August 1992, Wisłoka won 4-2 an away game vs Sandecja Nowy Sącz. On 26 August 1992, Wisłoka won another away game (3-0 vs. Stal II Mielec). On 20 October 1992 Wisłoka beat at home Hutnik Kraków 2–1. On 10 November 1992, Wisłoka headed to the town of Police, beating 3-2 Chemik Police. Finally, in the quarterfinals of the Cup of Poland (10 and 23 March 1993), Wisłoka twice lost to Ruch II Chorzów (0-1 at home, and 0–2 away). Nevertheless, the quarterfinals against Ruch were the biggest success in the history of Wisłoka's soccer team.

Wisłoka's major soccer achievements and most famous players
 Second National Division – from 1972 to 1979 and from 1991 to 1995. In 1973/74 Wisłoka finished on the 5th position – the highest in the team's history,
 quarter-finals of the Cup of Poland – 1992/1993 (against Ruch II Chorzow),

Most famous players who were taught soccer in Wisłoka are: 
 Leszek Pisz (played in Legia Warszawa, winning Cup of Poland for four times, Championships of Poland twice, Supercup of Poland twice (1990, 1995), qualifying to the quarter-finals of the European Champions League (1994/1995) and qualifying to the semifinals of European Cup of Winners cup (1990/1991). Pisz was a key player and captain of Legia, he also played a few games in Polish National Team,
 Waldemar Piątek, who played in Lech Poznań, got sick and had to give up his career. Piatek won the Cup and Supercup of Poland. In July 2004 Piatek was called up to the Poland national football team for a 1-1 Chicago draw vs. USA, but spent the whole game on the bench.

Other sports
Wisłoka's athletes excelled not only in soccer. In fact, the club's biggest successes are associated with a completely different sport – wrestling, Greco-Roman style. The wrestlers have won numerous medals, in all kinds of competitions. This is a short list of their main achievements:

Wrestling, Greco-Roman style
Olympic Games:
 gold – Kazimierz Lipien – Montreal 1976,
 silver – Jozef Lipien – Moscow 1980,
 bronze – Kazimierz Lipien – Munich 1972 and Andrzej Skrzydlewski – Montreal 1976.

World Champions (gold medals only):
 Jozef Lipien – Teheran 1973,
 Kazimierz Lipien – Teheran 1973,
 Kazimierz Lipien – Katowice 1974,
 Ryszard Swierad – Gothenburg 1981,
 Roman Wroclawski – Katowice 1982

European Champions (gold medals only):
 Jan Michalik – Katowice 1972,
 Jan Michalik – Helsinki 1973,
 Kazimierz Lipien – Ludwigsdorf 1975,
 Kazimierz Lipien – Leningrad 1976,
 Kazimierz Lipien – Oslo 1978,
 Ryszard Swierad – Goeteborg 1981

Boxing
European Championships
 silver – Roman Gotfryd – Halle 1977,
 bronze – Roman Gotfryd – Belgrade 1978.

Cycling
Individual Championships of Poland:
 gold – Andrzej Barszcz – Nysa 1991,
 bronze – Stanislaw Czaja – Radom 1977.

Karate
Championships of Poland:
 bronze – Piotr Szczerba – Szczecin 1988,
 bronze – Piotr Szczerba – Prudnik 1990,
 bronze – Janusz Szeliga – Prudnik 1990,
 bronze – Piotr Szczerba – Dębica 1991.
 bronze – Tomasz Zelazny – Belchatow 1991.

External links
 Official club website
 Unofficial club website
 Wisloka's stadium on GoogleMaps

Association football clubs established in 1908
Dębica
Football clubs in Podkarpackie Voivodeship
1908 establishments in Poland
1908 establishments in Austria-Hungary